General Mansilla may refer to:

Lucio Norberto Mansilla (1789–1871), Argentine Confederation general
Lucio Victorio Mansilla (1831–1913), Argentine general
Williams Mansilla (born 1964, Guatemalan general
General Mansilla, Buenos Aires, a settlement in Magdalena Partido, Buenos Aires Province, Argentina